O'Connell may refer to:

People 
O'Connell (name), people with O'Connell as a last name or given name

Schools 
 Bishop Denis J. O'Connell High School, a high school in Arlington, Virginia

Places 
 Mount O'Connell National Park in Queensland, Australia
 O'Connell Bridge across the river Liffey in Dublin
 O'Connell Street, main street in Dublin, Ireland
 Stephen C. O'Connell Center, indoor arena at the University of Florida
 O'Connell, New South Wales

See also 
 Connell (disambiguation)
 Connelly (disambiguation)
 Justice O'Connell (disambiguation)